Les Châteaux de sable is a 2015 French romantic drama film directed by Olivier Jahan, starring Emma de Caunes, Yannick Renier and Jeanne Rosa.

Plot 
Éléonore is a photographer in her thirties who has just lost her father. She decides to set out for the house which her father had bequeathed her, with Samuel, her former boyfriend.

Cast 
 Emma de Caunes as Éléonore
 Yannick Renier as Samuel
 Jeanne Rosa as Claire Andrieux
 Christine Brucher as Maëlle Prigent
 Alain Chamfort as Éléonore's father
 Gaëlle Bona as Laure
 Paul Bandey as Bill
 Nathan Rippy as Alistair

References

External links 
 

2015 films
2015 romantic drama films
2010s French-language films
French romantic drama films
2010s French films